The 1957 football season was São Paulo's 28th season since the club's existence.

Overall

{|class="wikitable"
|-
|Games played || 67 (9 Torneio Rio-São Paulo, 37 Campeonato Paulista, 21 Friendly match)
|-
|Games won ||  34 (3 Torneio Rio-São Paulo, 23 Campeonato Paulista, 8 Friendly match)
|-
|Games drawn || 21 (2 Torneio Rio-São Paulo, 9 Campeonato Paulista, 10 Friendly match)
|-
|Games lost || 12 (4 Torneio Rio-São Paulo, 5 Campeonato Paulista, 3 Friendly match)
|-
|Goals scored || 152
|-
|Goals conceded || 85
|-
|Goal difference || +67
|-
|Best result || 7–0 (H) v Linense - Campeonato Paulista - 1957.07.20
|-
|Worst result || 0–4 (H) v Portuguesa - Campeonato Paulista - 1957.10.27
|-
|Most appearances || 
|-
|Top scorer || 
|-

Friendlies

Official competitions

Torneio Rio-São Paulo

Record

Campeonato Paulista

Record

External links
official website 

Association football clubs 1957 season
1957
1957 in Brazilian football